KORK-CD, virtual and UHF digital channel 35, is a low-powered, Class A YTA TV-affiliated television station licensed to Portland, Oregon, United States. The station is owned by Watch TV, Inc. The station was affiliated with the Home Shopping Network (HSN) until 2010.

Digital channels
The station's digital signal is multiplexed:

Translator

See also
KOXI-CD
KORS-CD

External links
WatchTV, Inc.

ORK-CD
1991 establishments in Oregon
Television channels and stations established in 1991
Low-power television stations in the United States